The principality of Liechtenstein is divided into eleven municipalities (singular ), most consisting of only a single town.

Municipalities

Exclaves and enclaves

Seven of the  have one or more exclaves, in addition to the main territory:

 Gamprin: 1 exclave
 Eschen: 1 exclave
 Planken: 4 exclaves, of which 1 is a true enclave
 Schaan: 4 exclaves, of which 1 is a true enclave
 Vaduz: 6 exclaves, of which 2 are true enclaves
 Triesenberg: 1 exclave
 Balzers: 2 exclaves

Data codes
In ISO 3166-2, the codes of the municipalities start with LI-, followed by two digits (01–11, assigned in alphabetical order).

In FIPS 10-4 (standard withdrawn in 2008), the codes of the municipalities started with LS-, followed by the same two digits as the ISO codes.

As a member of the EFTA, Liechtenstein is included in the Nomenclature of Territorial Units for Statistics (NUTS). The three NUTS levels all correspond to the country itself (NUTS-1: LI0; NUTS-2: LI00; NUTS-3: LI000). Below the NUTS levels, there are two LAU levels (LAU-1: electoral districts; LAU-2: municipalities).

See also
 ISO 3166-2:LI

References

External links

Communes of Liechtenstein, Statoids.com

 
Subdivisions of Liechtenstein
Liechtenstein, Municipalities
Liechtenstein 1
Enclaves and exclaves
Municipalities, Liechtenstein
Liechtenstein geography-related lists